Drifting Souls is a 1932 American Pre-Code drama film directed by Louis King and starring Lois Wilson, Theodore von Eltz and Raymond Hatton.

Cast
 Lois Wilson as Linda Lawrence 
 Theodore von Eltz as Joe Robson 
 Raymond Hatton as Scoop 
 Gene Gowing as Ted Merritt 
 Shirley Grey as Greta Janson 
 Guinn "Big Boy" Williams as Bing 
 Mischa Auer as Skeets 
 Edmund Breese as Brad Martin 
 Bryant Washburn as Littlefield 
 Edward LeSaint as Doctor 
 Blanche Payson as Landlady

References

Bibliography
 Pitts, Michael R. Poverty Row Studios, 1929–1940: An Illustrated History of 55 Independent Film Companies, with a Filmography for Each. McFarland & Company, 2005.

External links
 

1932 films
1932 drama films
American drama films
Films directed by Louis King
American black-and-white films
1930s English-language films
1930s American films